Mentha pamiroalaica is a mint species within the genus Mentha, endemic to the Gissar Range in Tajikistan. The species was recorded by Russian botanist Antonina Borissova in 1954.

Taxonomy
While it is accepted as a distinct species by authorities such as Plants of the World Online, some authors have treated Mentha pamiroalaica as simply a synonym of Mentha longifolia.

Description
Mentha pamiroalaica is a perennial species, it grows to 60–160 centimeters in height and produces lilac-colored flowers. It produces ovate to oblong or lanceate leaves 8–10 centimeters in length.

Use
Mentha pamiroalaica is eaten as food in traditional Uzbekistani cuisine.

Notes

References

 
 
 
 

pamiroalaica
Flora of Tajikistan
Plants described in 1954